is a station located in southeast Tokyo.

Station layout
Two elevated side platforms.

History 
August 1927 Opened as a station of Ikegami Electric Railway.

Bus services 
 bus stop
Tokyu Bus
<森05>Omori Garage - Ōmori Sta. - Ikegami Garage - Ikegami Sta. mae - Ebara Hospital mae - Senzoku-Ike

External links   
  Senzokuike Station (Tokyu)  

Railway stations in Tokyo
Railway stations in Japan opened in 1927
Tokyu Ikegami Line
Stations of Tokyu Corporation